(Come on, Join) The High Society is the debut album by the English band These Animal Men, released in 1994. The first single was "Speed King".

The album peaked at No. 62 on the UK Albums Chart. The band supported the album with a North American tour.

Production
The album was produced by Dave Eringa. The American release was repeatedly delayed, with a different track listing than the original English album.

Critical reception

Trouser Press called the album "a compelling bolt of content, not posture," praising the "taut songwriting, good singing, buzzing electricity and a dynamic grasp." CMJ New Music Monthly deemed most of the tunes "incredibly weak readings of generic songs from the early-'70s leather and mascara crowd." The Washington Post wrote: "Drawing on mod and glitter-rock precedents, songwriters/guitarists Boag and Hooligan have constructed lush pop fantasias that recall 'All the Young Dudes' more than 'Anarchy in the U.K.'"

Drowned in Sound opined that "stop-start punchdrunk anthems like 'Sharp Kid' and 'Too Sussed?' defined their generation more succinctly than 'Parklife' and gave people like Elastica a platform on which to kickstart their career."

Track listing

References

1994 debut albums
Albums produced by Dave Eringa
Indie rock albums by English artists